"Electric Trains" is a song by Squeeze, released as their second single from their eleventh album, Ridiculous. It peaked at number 44 in the UK Singles Chart.

Two versions of the single were released, each with entirely different B-sides.

Chris Difford later recorded a stripped-down version of the song titled "Playing With Electric Trains" on his 2002 solo album  I Didn’t Get Where I Am.

Track listing

CD #1
 "Electric Trains" (4:04)
 "Some Fantastic Place" (4:29)
 "It's Over" (3:45)
 "Hourglass" (3:16)

CD #2
 "Electric Trains" (4:04)
 "Crackerjack" (3:15)
 "Fighting for Peace" (3:15)
 "Cold Shoulder (live)" (5:37)

References

External links
Squeeze discography at Squeezenet

1995 singles
Songs about trains
Songs written by Chris Difford
Songs written by Glenn Tilbrook
Squeeze (band) songs
1995 songs